Namlea is a town and kecamatan on the northeastern coast of the Indonesian island of Buru. It is the capital of the Buru Regency.

Climate
Namlea has a tropical savanna climate (Aw) with moderate to heavy rainfall from December to July and moderate to little rainfall from August to November. Due to a strong rainshadow effect, it has the lowest rainfall on Buru Island.

References

Populated places in Maluku (province)
Regency seats of Maluku (province)
Buru